Visitors to Guinea must obtain a visa from one of the Guinean diplomatic missions unless they come from one of the countries or territories that are visa exempt.

Visa policy map

Visa exemption 
Citizens of the following countries as well as refugees and stateless persons residing in these countries can visit Guinea without a visa:

In addition, according to Timatic, nationals of  holding ordinary passports endorsed "for public affairs" do not require a visa for a maximum stay of 30 days.

Non-ordinary passports
Additionally, holders of diplomatic or service passports issued to nationals of China, Romania, Russia, South Africa and Zimbabwe do not require a visa for a maximum stay of 90 days. Holders of diplomatic passports of Turkey do not require a visa for a stay of up to 90 days.

Visa on arrival
Nationals of the  can obtain a visa on arrival for a stay up to 90 days according to IATA.

This information, however, is not supported by the official website of the Central Directorate of the Border Police (DCPAF) of the Ministry of Security and Civil Protection of Guinea, which states that UAE nationals must obtain an eVisa.

eVisa
Nationals of all countries and territories that require a visa can obtain an electronic visa.

Electronic visas are available for stays up to 90 days.

Citizens of Canada and the United States who obtain an eVisa can stay in Guinea for up to 5 years.

See also

Visa requirements for Guinean citizens

References 

Guinea
Foreign relations of Guinea